Bittium proteum is a species of sea snail, a marine gastropod mollusk in the family Cerithiidae.

Description
The shell size varies between 5 mm and 7 mm

Distribution
This species is distributed in the Red Sea, the Gulf of Aden and the Mediterranean Sea

References

 Houbrick R. (1978). Redescription of Bittium proteum (Jousseaume, 1930) with comments on its generic placements. The Nautilus 92 (1): 9–11
 Vine, P. (1986). Red Sea Invertebrates. Immel Publishing, London. 224 pp
 Gofas, S.; Le Renard, J.; Bouchet, P. (2001). Mollusca, in: Costello, M.J. et al. (Ed.) (2001). European register of marine species: a check-list of the marine species in Europe and a bibliography of guides to their identification. Collection Patrimoines Naturels, 50: pp. 180–213

External links

Cerithiidae
Gastropods described in 1930